The name Baker was used for three tropical cyclones in the Atlantic Ocean.
 Hurricane Baker (1950), struck Leeward Islands, Puerto Rico, Hispaniola, Cuba, and Gulf Coast of the United States; caused $2,550,000 in damage (1950 US dollars) and one death
 Tropical Storm Baker (1951), no threat to land
 Hurricane Baker (1952), brushed southeastern Newfoundland, but caused no damage

Atlantic hurricane set index articles